The Wexner Foundation focuses on the development of Jewish professional and volunteer leaders in North America and public leaders in Israel. Founded by Leslie Wexner, CEO of Limited Brands, and his wife, Abigail Wexner, the headquarters are located in New Albany, Ohio with additional offices in New York City and Jerusalem. In addition to the core leadership programs, the Wexner Foundation supports other Jewish charities on a local, national, and international level.

History
In the early 1980s, Leslie Wexner decided that what the Jewish community and Israel needed most was stronger leaders. When established Jewish organizations showed relatively little interest in investing in the development of leaders, Les decided to take up the mission with his own private philanthropy.

Originally, Les founded two separate organizations to pursue this mission: The Wexner Heritage Foundation and the Wexner Graduate Fellowship. The Wexner Heritage Foundation created the Wexner Heritage Program to strengthen volunteer leaders. The Wexner Graduate Fellowship was created for emerging professional Jewish leaders. The Wexner Israel Fellowship was created for mid-career Israeli public officials. In the 1990s, Abigail Wexner joined her husband in charting the Wexner philanthropic vision and their roles as chairmen. In 2003, the two foundations merged, and since then The Wexner Foundation has run its programs as a unified organization under Abigail and Les's leadership. The Foundation has also added new programs to expand upon its mission of strengthening Jewish leaders. Since 2013, The Wexner Foundation has launched four additional programs: Wexner Service Corps (2013), Wexner Field Fellowship (2013), Wexner Senior Leaders (2014), and The Wexner Summits (2015).

The first of The Foundation's core programs was founded in 1985. Leslie Wexner and Rabbi Herbert A. Friedman, the former CEO of the National United Jewish Appeal, established the Wexner Heritage Program. This program's mission statement, according to the Wexner Foundation website, is "to educate Jewish communal leaders in the history, thought, traditions and contemporary challenges of the Jewish people."

In 1988, the Wexner Graduate Fellowship Program was founded by the Wexner Foundation. It awards scholarships to 20 exceptional individuals in North America who wish to obtain degrees in Jewish education, Jewish leadership, rabbinical studies, or cantorate studies. The mission of this program is "to encourage promising candidates to successfully meet the challenges of professional Jewish leadership in the North American Jewish community."

The Wexner Israel Fellowship Program was created in 1989. It is a partnership between the Wexner Foundation and Harvard University's John F. Kennedy School of Government. The program annually selects up to 10 Israeli public officials and/or nonprofit leaders to participate in leadership seminars while they pursue a mid-career Master of Public Administration (MPA) degree at the Kennedy School. The goal of this program, according to the Wexner Foundation website, is "To provide Israel's next generation of public leaders with advanced training in public management and leadership development, thus enhancing the quality of democracy and the institutional vitality of Israel's public sector."

The Wexner Foundation headquarters are located in New Albany, Ohio. Smaller Wexner Foundation offices can be found in New York City and Israel. The president of the Wexner Foundation is Rabbi B. Elka Abrahamson.

Core leadership programs
The Wexner Foundation consists of seven core leadership programs: Wexner Graduate Fellowship, Wexner Israel Fellowship, Wexner Heritage Program, Wexner Field Fellowship, Wexner Senior Leaders, Wexner Service Corps, and The Wexner Summits.

The Wexner Heritage Program (1985) was designed to provide young North American Jewish volunteer leaders with a two-year intensive Jewish learning program, deepening their understanding of Jewish history, values, and texts and enriching their leadership skills. By the end of 2018, 2,025 North American Jewish leaders from 34 cities will have participated in the program.

The Wexner Graduate Fellowship Program (1988) was created for outstanding rabbinical students and graduate students in Jewish education and Jewish communal service programs. In its early years, the Foundation established a grants program for academic institutions of all types to build and improve training programs for Jewish community professionals. Eventually, the Fellowship Program was expanded to include top candidates for academic Jewish studies and the cantorate. By the end of 2018, over 550 outstanding Jewish professional leaders from a wide array of religious affiliations and professional groupings will have participated in the Wexner Graduate Fellowship/Davidson Scholars Program.

The Wexner Israel Fellowship Program (1989) annually selects up to 10 outstanding mid-career Israeli public officials to study for a master's degree in the mid-career program of Harvard's Kennedy School of Government. The goal of the fellowship is to provide Israel's next generation of public leaders with advanced leadership and public management training. By the end of 2018, 260 Israeli public officials will have participated in the Israel Fellowship, including leaders who have gone on to become Directors General of government ministries, Generals and Commanders in the Israeli military, and top advisors to Prime Ministers.

The Wexner Service Corps (2013) is a program designed to inspire and unite Columbus-area Jewish teens to engage in service-learning. The Service Corps is open to high school juniors and seniors to participate in a week-long service trip followed by a year of monthly volunteering and Jewish learning. A select group of Corps members can return for a second year to join the Senior Leadership Cohort (SLC). The Service Corps launched in June 2013 with an inaugural service trip to New York and has since served in New Orleans, Detroit, Pittsburgh, Philadelphia, and most recently Houston. Columbus Jewish teens have cumulatively put in thousands of service hours into serving both the Columbus community and the communities it visits. The Wexner Service Corps was inspired by Hannah Wexner and the mantle was taken up by her sister Sarah.

The Wexner Field Fellowship (2013) is a special opportunity to grow as a Jewish professional, deepen your leadership skills and develop a rich network of colleagues to support your career. Wexner Field Fellows Program in partnership with the Jim Joseph Foundation to provide opportunities for professional growth to promising Jewish professionals who plan to continue to pursue a career as a professional leader in the North American Jewish community. More than 60 Field Fellows have engaged in the program since its inception.

The Wexner Senior Leaders (2015) is an executive model leadership initiative and aspires to leverage The Wexner Foundation's long-established partnerships with the Israeli Government and Harvard University, with the goal of strengthening Israel's public service leadership. The program aims to strengthen skills and design strategies for leading trans-formative change, acquiring new tools for better decision-making, and developing strategies to be employed by some of Israel's most promising and influential senior leaders in the public sector. The program prepares a select cohort each year to exercise collaborative leadership within and across organizations and sectors. To date, more than 120 executives have taken part in the Senior Leaders program.

The Wexner Summits provide a space for Alumni and Network Members to work together to identify common goals and values. Commitments and work that emerge from the Summits aim to strengthen our individual and collective efforts with a goal to provide answers for controversial issue in the Jewish world.

Notable fellows 

 Marla Berkowitz

Controversy 

In April 2003, a research report for the Wexner Foundation was leaked which was entitled Wexner Analysis: Israeli Communication Priorities 2003. The document was prepared by the Luntz Research Companies and Israel Project. The document was a public relationship document which provided communication strategies for American supporters of Israel, especially those in the media, on how to sway U.S. public opinion in favor of Israel in the Israeli–Palestinian conflict, and how to link Israel's interests with those of the United States. It was considered controversial since it was seen as a covert communication campaign for swaying the American public and showed a lack of good faith in resolving the conflict.

In October 2018, Israeli reporter Erel Segal and news outlets such as mida had reported that US$2.3 million had been transferred to Ehud Barak for unknown work between 2004 and 2006 by the Wexner foundation, which had described the money transfer as payment for research.

On October 29 Maariv (through its Israeli radio station) reported that Ehud Barak had been given the funds while he was a private citizen and the fund transfer is under investigation.

However, on November 6 a call for investigation by the attorney general of Israel had been filed.  The following day, it was reported that contrary to initial claims, the Wexner funds had been transferred to Ehud Barak while he may not have been a private person.

Jeffrey Epstein, the American financier and convicted sex offender, was a trustee of the foundation from 1992 to 2007. Epstein, according to The New York Times, held "an unusually strong hold on Mr. Wexner," and "[h]eld the title of President of the Wexner family financial office." Still, an eighteen page "independent" review conducted the law firm Kegler, Brown — like Wexner's entities also based in Columbus, Ohio — stated that "Epstein Played No Meaningful Role in the Foundation’s Budget, Finances or Accounting Processes" and that "Epstein Played No Role in the Operation of the Foundation’s Fellowships or Other Programs." This report raised its own separate yet interrelated questions about Wexner's and the foundation's leadership and oversight by alumni and graduates. If trustees such as Epstein "signed actions authorizing the appointment of Foundation officers and trustees" (according to Kegler), was the foundation also questionably led in ways similar to how Wexner enabled (to use Yehuda Kurtzer's words) "many of the behaviors that we keep reading about that took place in some of the companies under Les’ leadership"?

On June 23, 2020, the Miami Herald reported that Howard Cooper, an attorney for Alan Dershowitz, admitted in court two days prior the possession of court filings and depositions of a woman who testified that she was "trafficked" to Wexner and others.

See also
 Ohio State University Wexner Medical Center
 Wexner Center for the Arts

References

External links
 Official website
 Wexner Israel Fellowship at Harvard Kennedy School 

Foundations based in the United States
Organizations established in 1980
Les Wexner